Voetbal Inside (previously named as Voetbal Inside (2001-2007), RTL Voetbal Inside (2007-2008) and Voetbal International (2008-2015)) is a Dutch football talk show that has aired on TV channel RTL 7. In a studio, host Wilfred Genee discusses the latest developments in Dutch and international football with Johan Derksen, René van der Gijp and a guest. The program is named after and sponsored by the football magazine Voetbal International. Other sponsors include the Eerste Divisie, Toto, Gillette, FOX Sports and Sport1. Voetbal Inside is known for its humoristic moments and remarks.

In 2011, the talk show won the prestigious Dutch television award the "Gouden Televizierring" and Wilfred Genee won the "Zilveren Televisie-Ster" in 2017 for being the best host.

Host 
 2001–2005, 2007–present, Wilfred Genee
 2006, Barbara Barend

Permanent guests 
 2008–present, René van der Gijp
 2001–present, Johan Derksen
 2009–2020, Danny Vera with band

Regular guests 
 2008–2021, Hans Kraay, Jr.
 2010–2022, Johan Boskamp
 2012–2016 , Wim Kieft
 2014–present, Valentijn Driessen
 2014–2022, Gertjan Verbeek

Returning guests 
 2010–2014, Barbara Barend
 2010–2014, Jan Joost van Gangelen
 2011–2014, Aad de Mos
 2011 - 2012, Willem van Hanegem
 2010 - 2011, Erik Dijkstra
 2010 - 2011, Wouter Bos
 2011, Iwan van Duren
 2011, Jan Everse
 2011, Koert Westerman
 2010–2014, Emile Schelvis
 2016, Peter Hyballa

Ratings and "Televizierring" 
The rating of the first episode from the newest season was a record with 831,000 viewers and was in the top 10 ratings that night (17 August). The last record is from 28 February 2011. René van der Gijp was nominated individually in 2010 for the "Televizier Talent Award" for best television newcomer. On 1 October 2011, the nominees were announced for the 2011 "Gouden Televizierring".  Johan Derksen was nominated for the "Gouden Televizierster Man" for best male television personality and Voetbal International was nominated for best television program. On 21 October 2011, Johan Derksen lost to Jeroen van Koningsbrugge but Voetbal Inside won the "Gouden Televizierring".

References 

Association football television series
2008 Dutch television series debuts
Dutch sports television series
Dutch-language television shows
RTL 7 original programming